Ferzikovo railway station is a  train station Moscow Railway in urban-type settlements Ferzikovo in Kaluga Oblast. It opened in 1874. The station consists of two low platforms: the side and the island. Any station with a waiting room and a suburban insurance fund. Electrification of the station is not available, suburban carried diesel train. At the station, stop all suburban trains through Kaluga — Tula, including accelerated diesel train links Kaluga —  Tula and Kaluga — Tula — Uzlovaja. In the summer of 2013 through the station runs a small number of long-distance trains with a particular timetable, none of them stops at the station did not have.

References

External links
Станция на Wikimapia

Railway stations in Kaluga Oblast